Rhinoceros in Love is a Chinese play by Liao Yimei, originally directed by her husband Meng Jinghui in 1999, and subsequently performed more than 2,500 times and seen by more than a million people. The play was translated to English by Mark Talacko in 2012. A new English translation by Claire Conceison was commissioned by the BBC in 2014 for a radio play broadcast and was used for the surtitles for the play's US tours in 2017 and 2018.

The play describes the love of a rhinoceros feeder for a beautiful woman. It has been described as a 'classic drama' of modern Chinese theatre.

It is a production of the National Theatre Company of China.

In August 2012, it became the first play in the People's Republic of China (1949- ) to reach 1,000 performances.

References

External links
Rhinoceros in Love translated by Mark Talacko
 http://www.bbc.co.uk/programmes/b04lpqnn	BBC radio broadcast of "Rhinoceros in Love" in English

Chinese plays
1999 plays